Grigory Samoylovich Kabakov (Russian: Григорий Самойлович Кабаковский; 2 October 1909 – 1959) was a Ukrainian Red Army lieutenant and Hero of the Soviet Union. Kabakov was awarded the title for leading his company during the Battle of the Dnieper in September 1943, where he reportedly killed 60 German soldiers.

Early life 
Kabakov was born on 2 October 1909 in the village of Kuchubeivka in Poltava Governorate to a peasant family. He graduated from primary school. Kabakov worked as a mechanic in a sugar factory in Artemivka village. In 1938, he joined the Communist Party of the Soviet Union. From 1940, he headed the trade department of the Opishnya Executive Committee.

World War II 
Kabakov was drafted into the Red Army in 1941 and sent to the front. He fought on the Southwestern Front, Northwestern Front, Central Front and Kalinin Front. Kabakov was seriously wounded twice. Near Dnipropetrovsk in late 1941, he reportedly took command after his company commander was wounded, and led five counterattacks. He was with the 33rd Tank Brigade (later 57th Guards Tank Brigade) from its formation and fought near Moscow.

In the fall of 1943 Kabakov was a lieutenant and company commander in the motor rifle battalion of the 57th Guards Tank Brigade of the 7th Guards Mechanized Corps. When the company reached the Desna River, he reportedly organized the crossing. The Dnieper was reached by 25 September. The company led by Kabakov crossed the river north of Kiev. With grenades, rifle fire and a machine gun, Kabakov reportedly killed 60 German soldiers in the battle to hold the bridgehead. In pursuit of retreating German troops, the company reportedly advanced to the northern outskirts of Domantovo, Chernobyl Raion, reportedly killing about 50 German soldiers. The German forces counterattacked but were reportedly repulsed three times. While repulsing a counterattack, Kabakov was reportedly seriously wounded but continued to command. On 17 October 1943 he was awarded the title Hero of the Soviet Union and the Order of Lenin for his actions.

Postwar 
After the war Kabakov returned to Chutove Raion. He became a collective farm chairman and chairman of the Pogrebky MTS. In 1946 he became a deputy of the Supreme Soviet of the Soviet Union at its Second Convocation. Kabakov died in 1959 and was buried in the village of Artemivka in Chutove Raion.

References 

1909 births
1959 deaths
Soviet Army officers
People from Poltava Governorate
Heroes of the Soviet Union
Recipients of the Order of Lenin
Recipients of the Order of the Red Banner
Soviet military personnel of World War II from Ukraine
Communist Party of the Soviet Union members
People from Poltava Oblast